Agon Elezi (born 1 March 2001) is a Macedonian Albanian professional footballer who plays as a midfielder for Croatian club Varaždin.

Career

Born in Skopje, Macedonia, he played for Shkupi in the Macedonian First League between 2014 and 2016. In 2016 he attended Brooke House College Football Academy in Market Harborough. The Academy plays fixtures in Cup Competitions, including ISFA, ESFA & County Cups. Alongside these competitions, players will play in a competitive game Programme from Professional Clubs to School sides. In the 2017-2018 season Elezi signed a contract with the French side Caen where he spent a year of his youth career playing here.

International career
Elezi was part of the Macedonia national under-21 football team. In the past, he was part of the U-19 and U-17 teams as well.

On 23 September 2022, he made his debut for the Macedonian national team in a UEFA Nations League match against Georgia. As of February 2023, he has earned a total of 2 caps.

Honours

Club
Varaždin
Druga nogometna liga Winner: 2021-22

References

External links
 
 

2001 births
Living people
Footballers from Skopje
Albanian footballers from North Macedonia
Association football midfielders
Macedonian footballers
North Macedonia under-21 international footballers
KF Skënderbeu Korçë players
NK Varaždin (2012) players
Kategoria Superiore players
Macedonian expatriate footballers
Expatriate footballers in Albania
Macedonian expatriate sportspeople in Albania
Expatriate footballers in Croatia
Macedonian expatriate sportspeople in Croatia